John Constable Gregory (17 August 1842 – 28 June 1894) was an English first-class cricketer active 1865–71 who played for Middlesex and Surrey. He was born in Marylebone and died in Weymouth. He was a righthanded batsman and was the captain of Surrey in 1871. He played in 23 first-class matches.

References

1842 births
1894 deaths
English cricketers
Middlesex cricketers
North v South cricketers
Surrey cricketers